Benjamin Haigh Green (23 February 1883 – 26 April 1917) was an English professional footballer who played as an inside forward. He scored 117 goals from 406 matches in the Football League playing for Barnsley, Small Heath (renamed Birmingham in 1905), Burnley, Preston North End and Blackpool.

He made nearly 200 appearances for Small Heath / Birmingham in all competitions, and scored the first goal at the club's new ground, St Andrew's, on 29 December 1906, three days after the official opening, for which he was rewarded with a piano.

Green was born in Penistone, Yorkshire, and was killed in action in France in 1917, where he was serving as a private with the King's Own (Royal Lancaster Regiment).

Notes

References 

1883 births
1917 deaths
People from Penistone
English footballers
Association football forwards
Barnsley F.C. players
Birmingham City F.C. players
Burnley F.C. players
Preston North End F.C. players
Blackpool F.C. players
English Football League players
King's Own Royal Regiment soldiers
British military personnel killed in World War I
Footballers from Yorkshire
British Army personnel of World War I
Military personnel from Yorkshire